Chiesanuova is a minor municipality of San Marino. It has a population of 1,143 inhabitants (May 2018) in an area of 5.46 km2.

Etymology
From Italian chiesa ("church") + nuova, feminine singular of nuovo ("new").

History
The medieval castle of Busignano was situated in this area, and in 1320, its inhabitants decided to join San Marino. The name Chiesanuova dates back to the 16th century, around the rebuilding of the church of Saint Giovanni Battista in Curte, which no longer exists. The renovation of Salvatore Conti Square was conceived by the Italian poet, writer, and screenwriter Tonino Guerra and completed in 2011.

In the 2021 San Marino abortion referendum, Chiesanuova voted the most against the legalization of abortion up to 12 weeks, with the "NO" vote at 27.05%. The "YES" vote reached 72.95%.

Geography
It borders the San Marino municipalities San Marino and Fiorentino and the Italian municipalities Sassofeltrio, Verucchio and San Leo.

The Project San Marino-Sarajevo

On 14 July 2010, on the initiative of the Capitano di Castello (Mayor) Franco Santi and the San Marino ambassador in Sarajevo Michele Chiaruzzi, the Giunta di Castello (local government) placed a monumental plaque in memory of the Srebrenica massacre (Bosnia and Herzegovina). It is one of the first public monuments in Europe dedicated to those events.

Parishes
Chiesanuova has 7 parishes (curazie):
Caladino, Confine, Galavotto, Molarini, Poggio Casalino, Poggio Chiesanuova, Teglio

References

 
Municipalities of San Marino
Italy–San Marino border crossings